Suraj Narredu (born 7 February 1985) is an Indian jockey.

Biography
Regarded amongst the top jockeys this country has ever produced, Suraj started riding at the BARI riding school ( which is in no use ) in Bangalore at the young age of 12.

The son of ex jockey, and current trainer, Satish Narredu and nephew of ex jockey and current trainer, Malesh Narredu, Suraj has been exposed to horse racing since he was born. His family nurtured his dream of becoming a professional jockey, and guided him to make a fruitful career out of his passion.

Career
The highlights of Suraj Narredu’s career would be when he won the McDowell's Indian Derby in record timing, with Be Safe in 2015. Suraj still maintains that Be Safe is the best horse he has ever ridden.

2014-2015 saw a dream phase for Suraj’s career where he won most of the Classic races of the year with three horses, Be Safe, Quasar and Godspeed. 
Since then Suraj has won the Indian derby thrice with Star Superior(2019), War hammer(2020) and Immortality(2021) . 
Suraj has garnered International riding experience by doing sort riding stints abroad in riding centres in USA, France, Dubai and most recently, Ireland where he worked alongside world renowned professionals like Aidan O'Brien, Joseph Patrick O'Brien and John Oxx
He has won races in Macau, Malaysia and Mauritius where he won the International Jockeys Challenge in 2011.

References

External link

Living people
Indian jockeys
1985 births
Sportspeople from Bangalore